Derek is the surname of:

 Bo Derek (born 1956), American actress, film producer and model, fourth wife of John Derek
 Jenny Derek, Australian model
 John Derek (1926–1998), American actor, director, screenwriter, producer and photographer, born Derek Delevan Harris
Surnames from given names